Harold Beaudine (November 29, 1894 – May 9, 1949) was an early Hollywood film director of silent films. William Beaudine was his brother. He directed more than 70 films, many of them short films. Beaudine was born in New York City and died in Sawtelle, Los Angeles, California. He is known for his action filled comedies. His career dropped off with the development of "talkies" and the end of the silent era.

Filmography

References

External links

1894 births
1949 deaths
American film directors